Pelican (or Untitled) is the first EP by the heavy metal band Pelican. It was originally released in 2001 as a demo album, before the band signed to Hydra Head Records, who re-released it in 2003. "Mammoth" was extended and re-released as "Pink Mammoth" on the band's Pink Mammoth EP.

Track listing
All songs written by Pelican.
 "Pulse" – 4:01 
 "Mammoth" – 4:57 
 "Forecast for Today" – 7:29 
 "The Woods" – 12:58

Personnel

Band members
Trevor de Brauw – guitar
Bryan Herweg – bass
Larry Herweg – drums
Laurent Schroeder-Lebec – guitar

Other personnel
Andrew Furse – photography
Jason Hellman – album artwork and design
Peter Nilges – photocopy manipulation
Sanford Parker – production
Aaron Turner – album artwork and design
Douglas Ward – mastering

References

Pelican (band) albums
2003 debut EPs
Hydra Head Records EPs